Betty C. Monkman is a former White House Curator and author of The White House: Its Historic Furnishings and First Families and The Living White House.

She joined the Curator's office in 1967 and helped fill gaps in the White House's collection. Monkman served as Chief Curator from 1997 through 2002. Among her duties was supervising the changeover between presidential administrations, including between Bill Clinton and George W. Bush.

Upon her retirement, she had served as curator under eight presidents.

References

White House Curators
American writers
Year of birth missing (living people)
Living people